Joël Wakanumuné (born 30 September 1986) is a New Caledonian international footballer who plays for the New Caledonian side Magenta in the  New Caledonia Super Ligue, and the New Caledonia national team.

Wakanumuné represented New Caledonia in ten qualifying matches for the 2014 FIFA World Cup, as well as the 2012 OFC Nations Cup. He also appeared in the OFC Nations Cup final, in which New Caledonia lost 1-0 to Tahiti.

His brother is the footballer Jean-Patrick Wakanumuné, who plays for the New Caledonian club Gaïtcha FCN.

References

External links 
 
 Joël Wakanumuné at Footballdatabase

1986 births
Living people
New Caledonian footballers
Pays d'Aix FC players
People from Nouméa
New Caledonia international footballers
Association football midfielders
AS Magenta players
AS Mont-Dore players
2012 OFC Nations Cup players
2016 OFC Nations Cup players
Chambéry SF players